The 1914 Victorian state election was held on 26 November 1914.

Retiring Members

Liberal 

 Ewen Hugh Cameron (Evelyn)
 Thomas Langdon (Korong)
 George Graham (Goulburn Valley)
 John Thomson (Dundas)
 William Watt (Essendon)

Legislative Assembly
Sitting members are shown in bold text. Successful candidates are highlighted in the relevant colour. Where there is possible confusion, an asterisk (*) is also used.

See also

 Members of the Victorian Legislative Assembly, 1911–1914
 Members of the Victorian Legislative Assembly, 1914–1917

References

Psephos - Adam Carr's Election Archive

Victoria
Candidates for Victorian state elections